Aerobics engineering is a fast growing field of engineering which encompasses the design and production of sports equipment and facilities, performance measurement and athletic feedback systems, and the study of kinematics, dynamics and biomechanics as they pertain to sport.  The field overlaps other fields of science and engineering, including physics, mechanical engineering, electrical engineering, and materials science, and many practitioners hold degrees in those fields rather than in sports engineering specifically.
While sports engineering is not a well known field among pre-college students, professional societies are working to change that. Study programs in sports engineering and technology at either the undergraduate or graduate level are now offered at a number of universities.

A sports engineering congress is biannually held, hosted by the International Sports Engineering Association, termed 'The Engineering of Sport'. This conference brings world leading researchers, sports professionals and industry organizations together to celebrate the profession, showcasing new innovations in both research, and industry. The 13th conference in 2020 was scheduled to take place in Tokyo, Japan, but was held online because of the COVID-19 pandemic; the 2022 conference is planned to take place at Purdue University, Indiana, United States.

Study programs in sports engineering 
 Loughborough University (UK)
Strathclyde University (Scotland)
Centre for Sports Engineering Research (CSER)  - Sheffield Hallam University (UK)
 TU Delft (Netherlands)
 Griffith University (Australia)
 University of Adelaide (Australia)
 TU Chemnitz (Germany) (undergraduate)
 TU Chemnitz (Germany) (graduate)
 University of Otago (New Zealand)
 Aalborg University (Denmark)
 Private University of Applied Sciences (Germany)
 Mittuniversitetet (Sweden)
 Deutsche Sporthochschule Köln (Germany)
 University of Applied Sciences Technikum Wien (Austria)(undergraduate)
 University of Applied Sciences Technikum Wien (Austria)(graduate)
 University of Debrecen, Faculty of Engineering (Hungary)
 Islamic Azad University, Science and Research Branch (Iran) (undergraduate & postgraduate student)
University of Magedeburg (Germany)

Scientific journals 
 Sports Engineering, by Springer for the International Sports Engineering Association
 Proceedings of the Institution of Mechanical Engineers, Part P: Journal of Sports Engineering and Technology, by SAGE Publishing

See also
 Sports medicine
 Sports science
 Biomechanics
 Physics
 Mechanical engineering

References

Engineering disciplines
Sports equipment